New Writings in SF 14 is an anthology of science fiction short stories edited by John Carnell, the fourteenth volume in a series of thirty, of which he edited the first twenty-one. It was first published in hardcover by Dennis Dobson in 1969, followed by a paperback edition under the slightly variant title of New Writings in S.F.-14 by Corgi the same year.

The book collects seven novelettes and short stories by various science fiction authors, with a foreword by Carnell. The second and fifth stories were later reprinted in the American edition of New Writings in SF 9.

Contents
"Foreword" (John Carnell)
"Blood Brother" (James White)
"If You're So Smart" (Paul Corey)
"The Ballad of Luna Lil" (Sydney J. Bounds)
"The Eternity Game" (Vincent King)
"Tilt Angle" (R. W. Mackelworth)
"The Song of Infinity" (Domingo Santos)
"Green Five Renegade" (M. John Harrison)

External links

1969 anthologies
14